Nannoarctia himalayana is a moth of the family Erebidae first described by Vladimir Viktorovitch Dubatolov, Patrick G. Haynes and Yasunori Kishida in 2010. It is found in Nepal and India.

The length of the forewings is 17–17.5 mm for subspecies himalayana and 16–18 mm for subspecies nepalica. Subspecies himalayana has dark brown forewings with two large spots behind the cell and a slightly S-shaped oblique band running from the wing apex towards the middle of the hind margin. The hindwings are light yellow with a brown costal margin. The forewings of subspecies nepalica are dark brown with two elongate spots behind the cell and a narrow oblique band running from the wing apex towards the middle of the hind margin. The hindwings are light yellow, with a brown costal margin and a small brown spot at the
tornus.

Subspecies
Nannoarctia himalayana himalayana (India: Himachal Pradesh and probably Kashmir)
Nannoarctia himalayana nepalica Dubatolov, Haynes & Kishida, 2010 (Nepal and India: Uttar Pradesh, Assam and probably Nagaland)

References

Moths described in 2010
Spilosomina